Park Ave. was an indie pop band which started in January 1996 in Omaha, Nebraska.

The band lasted only two and a half years, but still retains a substantial fanbase. During their short time together, Park Ave. (named after an actual street in their hometown of Omaha, Nebraska) received rave reviews for their brand of indie pop music. The band was born out of members' desire to write pop, almost bubblegum pop, music.

None of the members could play their respective musical instruments prior to forming the band. Conor Oberst had been playing guitar since a very young age, yet played drums in the band. Clark Baechle had played drums previously, but played guitar for Park Ave. Park Ave. performed about 10-15 times during its existence. When Jamie moved to London to work in art, the band broke up, hence the name of their 1999 album. Before she went to London they recorded some songs on 4-track to have for themselves, these recordings eventually became their first and only album. However, Jamie returned and she and Jenkins reunited in Tilly and the Wall, which also includes Nick White, Kianna Alarid, and Derek Pressnall. Conor Oberst now has a successful career as Bright Eyes with work in Desaparecidos, Mystic Valley Band as well as Monsters of Folk while Clark Baechle is the drummer of The Faint.

Band members
  Clark Baechle (guitar, vocals)
  Jenn Bernard (keyboards, vocals)
  Neely Jenkins (bass guitar, vocals)
  Conor Oberst (drums, vocals)
  Jamie Williams (guitar, vocals)

Discography 
When Jamie Went to London... We Broke Up (1999 - Urinine Records)

Although the original pressing of When Jamie Went To London...We Broke Up went out of print due to Urinine Records' closure, Team Love Records re-pressed it in late 2005.

The Wrens/Park Ave. Split 7" (1998 - Saddle Creek Records)

See also
 Bright Eyes
 Desaparecidos
 The Faint
 Tilly and the Wall
 Commander Venus

References

External links
Saddle Creek Records
Team Love Records
Park Ave on Myspace
Lazy-i Interview: August 1999

Conor Oberst
Indie rock musical groups from Nebraska
Musical groups from Omaha, Nebraska
Team Love Records artists
Saddle Creek Records artists